Chapman University's Dale E. Fowler School of Law, commonly referred to as Chapman University School of Law or Fowler School of Law, is a private, non-profit law school located in Orange, California. The school offers the Juris Doctor degree (JD), combined programs offering a JD/MBA and JD/MFA in Film & Television Producing. The school also offers emphasis options in Business Law, Criminal Law, Entertainment Law, Environmental Law, Entrepreneurial Law, International Law, Trial Advocacy, and Taxation. Currently, the school has 74 full- and part-time faculty members and a law library with holdings in excess of 290,000 volumes and volume equivalents.

Accreditation history
Established in 1995 as part of Chapman University, Chapman Law gained provisional accreditation from the American Bar Association (ABA) in 1998 and received full ABA accreditation in 2002. In addition to its ABA membership, the Association of American Law Schools admitted Chapman Law as one of its members in 2006. In 2019, the ABA again fully accredited the school until 2027, the standard seven-year accreditation term.

Rankings

Chapman University School of Law is currently ranked 118th by the U.S. News & World Reports annual law school rankings, and 43rd in part-time law schools.

Bar passage rate
For July, 2021, the first-time bar passage rate for Chapman School of Law was 79%. The overall first-time pass rate for ABA-accredited California law schools was 81%.

Costs and average student indebtedness
The cost of tuition for full-time JD students at Chapman for the 2021–2022 academic year was $57,873, which does not include living expenses and fees; and for part-time students was: $46,183 . Accordingly, of 2022 graduates, 74% incurred debt to attend Chapman, with an average indebtedness of $150,534.

Post-graduation employment

According to Chapman's official 2021 ABA-required disclosures, 89% of the Class of 2021 obtained bar passage required employment 10 months or less after graduation, 11% were employed in JD advantage jobs where bar passage was a desired qualification, but not required, and 12% reported they were unemployed.

Scholarships
Chapman, like some other law schools, uses merit based scholarships in order to entice competitive students who might otherwise pass over the school for higher ranked competitors and to enhance its own ranking.

Dean 
Paul D. Paton was named dean of Chapman University's Dale E. Fowler School of Law and the Donald P. Kennedy Chair in Law in March, 2023. He assumes the role from interim Dean Marisa Cianciarulo who served as interim-dean from December 1, 2021 through June 30, 2023. Prior deans include Matthew J. Parlow who served as dean from July 1, 2016 to December 1, 2021 who, in turn, succeeded Tom Campbell, dean of Fowler School of Law from 2011-2016.

Notable faculty
 Tom Campbell, Member of the United States Congress, 1989–1993 and 1995–2001, member of the California State Senate 1993–1995, and director of the California Department of Finance from 2004–2005.
 John C. Eastman, who represented Donald Trump in disputes over the 2020 US presidential election.  On January 13, 2021, Eastman retired from the Chapman University faculty after he had created controversy by speaking at a Trump rally that preceded the violent storming of the United States Capitol.
 Hugh Hewitt, radio host and co-panelist in several of the 2016 presidential debates.
 Celestine McConville, Constitutional law and death penalty scholar
 Vernon L. Smith, co-winner of the Nobel Prize in economics

Law journals 
Chapman's Fowler School of Law publishes the Chapman Law Review, a student-run scholarly journal. In addition to publishing the scholarly journal, the Chapman Law Review hosts a symposium at the start of the spring semester each year.

References

External links

Law
ABA-accredited law schools in California
Educational institutions established in 1995
1995 establishments in California
Education in Orange, California